The members of the 6th convocation of the National Assembly were elected on 3 May 2015.

Members of the National Assembly

See also 

 Sahakyan government

References

External links 

  National Assembly website

Artsakh